Munasovo (Monas) is a rural locality (a village) in Yanybayevsky Selsoviet, Belokataysky District, Bashkortostan, Russia. The population was 123 as of 2010. There is 1 street.

Geography 
Munasovo is located 27 km northwest of Novobelokatay (the district's administrative centre) by road. Voskhod is the nearest rural locality.

References 

Rural localities in Belokataysky District